The Canadian Journal of History/Annales canadiennes d'histoire is a triannual peer-reviewed academic journal covering all areas of history. It was established in 1966 at the University of Saskatchewan and was acquired by University of Toronto Press in 2019. It is abstracted and indexed in Historical Abstracts, America: History and Life, and Scopus. Articles are published in English or French.

References

External links

University of Toronto Press academic journals
History of the Americas journals
Triannual journals
Publications established in 1966
Multilingual journals